In model checking, the Metric Interval Temporal Logic (MITL) is a fragment of Metric Temporal Logic (MTL). This fragment is often preferred to MTL because some problems that are undecidable for MTL become decidable for MITL.

Definition 
A MITL formula is an MTL formula, such that each set of reals used in subscript are intervals, which are not singletons, and whose bounds are either a natural number or are infinite.

Difference from MTL 
MTL can express a statement such as the sentence S: "P held exactly ten time units ago". This is impossible in MITL. Instead, MITL can say T: "P held between 9 and 10 time units ago". Since MITL can express T but not S, in a sense, MITL is a restriction of MTL which allows only less precise statements.

Problems that MITL avoids 
One reason to want to avoid a statement such as S is that its truth value may change an arbitrary number of times in a single time unit. Indeed, the truth value of this statement may change as many times as the truth value of P change, and P itself may change an arbitrary number of time in a single time unit.

Let us now consider a system, such as a timed automaton or a signal automaton, which want to know at each instant whether S holds or not. This system should recall everything that occurred in the last 10 time units. As seen above, it means that it must recall an arbitrarily large number of events. This can not be implemented by a system with finite memory and clocks.

Bounded variability 
One of the main advantage of MITL is that each operator has the bounded variability property. Example:

Given the statement T defined above. Each time the truth value of T switches from false to true, it remains true for at least one time unit. Proof: At a time t where T becomes true, it means that:

 between 9 and 10 time units ago, P was true.
 just before time t, P was false.

Hence, P was true exactly 9 time units ago. It follows that, for each , at time , P was true  time units ago. Since , at time , T holds.

A system, at each instant, wants to know the value of T. Such a system must recall what occurred during the last ten time units. However, thanks to the bounded variability property, it must recall at most 10 time units when T becomes true. And hence 11 times when T becomes false. Thus this system must recall at most 21 events, and hence can be implemented as a timed automaton or a signal automaton.

Examples 
Examples of MITL formulas:

  states that the letter  appears at least once in each open interval of length 1.
  states that  holds exactly at each integral time and not anytime else.

Fragments

Safety-MTL0,∞
The fragment Safety-MTL0,v is defined as the subset of MITL0,∞ containing only formulas in positive normal form where the interval of every until operator has an upper bound.

Open and closed MITL 
The fragment Open-MTL contains the formula in positive normal form such that:

 for each ,  is open, and
 for each ,  is closed.

The fragment Closed-MITL contains the negation of formulas of Open-MITL.

Flat and Coflat MITL 
The fragment Flat-MTL contains the formula in positive normal form such that:

 for each , if  is unbounded, then  is a LTL-formula
 for each , if  is unbounded, then  is a LTL-formula

The fragment Coflat-MITL contains the negation of formulas of Flat-MITL.

Non-strict variant 
Given any fragment L, the fragment Lns is the restriction of L in which only non strict operators are used.

MITL0,∞ and MITL0
Given any fragment L, the fragment L0,∞ is the subset of L where the lower bound of each interval is 0 or the upper bound is infinity. Similarly we denote by L0 (respectively, L∞) the subset of L such that the lower bound of each interval is 0 (respectively, the upper bound of each interval is ∞).

Expressiveness over signals 
Over signals, MITL0 is as expressive as MITL. This can be proven by applying the following rewriting rules to a MITL formula.

  is equivalent to  if .
  is equivalent to  if .

Applying those rewriting rules exponentially increases the size of the formula.

Expressiveness over timed words 
Contrary to the case of signals, MITL is strictly more expressive than MITL0,∞.

Satisfiability problem 
The problem of deciding whether a MITL formula is satisfiable over a signal is in PSPACE-complete.

References needed 
R. Alur, T. Feder, and T.A. Henzinger. The Benefits of Relaxing Punctuality. Journal of the ACM, 43(1):116–146, 1996.
R. Alur and T.A. Henzinger. Logics and Models of Real-Time: A Survey. In Proc. REX Workshop, Real-time: Theory in Practice, pages 74–106. LNCS 600, Springer, 1992.
T.A. Henzinger. It's about Time: Real-time Logics Reviewed. In Proc. CONCUR'98, pages 439–454. LNCS 1466, Springer, 1998.

References

Temporal logic
Model checking